Shahnoza A. (born 1 May 2000) is an Uzbekistani footballer who plays as a forward. She has been a member of the Uzbekistan women's national football team.

International goals
Scores and results list Uzbekistan's goal tally first

See also
List of Uzbekistan women's international footballers

References 

2000 births
Living people
Uzbekistani women's footballers
Uzbekistan women's international footballers
Women's association football forwards
People from Surxondaryo Region
21st-century Uzbekistani women